West Terrace is a populated place in the parish of Saint James, Barbados. The National Cultural Foundation of Barbados is located in West Terrace.

See also
 List of cities, towns and villages in Barbados

References

Saint James, Barbados
Populated places in Barbados